Ramón Arroyo (November 15, 1954 – May 7, 2010) was an American playwright, poet and scholar of Puerto Rican descent who wrote numerous books and received many literary awards. He was a professor of English and Creative Writing at the University of Toledo in Ohio. His work deals extensively with issues of immigration, Latino culture, and homosexuality. Arroyo was openly gay and frequently wrote self-reflexive, autobiographical texts. He was the long-term partner of the American poet Glenn Sheldon.

Biography
Ramón Arroyo was born in Chicago, Illinois, to Puerto Rican parents. He began his career as a performance artist in the Chicago art galleries of the 1980s and eventually expanded into poetry, for which he has become best known.

Arroyo earned his Ph.D. in English and Cultural Studies from the University of Pittsburgh where he wrote his dissertation on issues surrounding the "Chicago Renaissance" that parallel the building of a contemporary Latino literary canon. He served as the co-Vice President of the Board of Directors for the Association of Writers & Writing Programs (AWP) and as the co-Chair for the 2009 Chicago Conference.

His last public poetry reading was at SUNY/Brockport on March 31, 2010.  His last three words to the public at that reading were: "Live.  Then Write."  Although it does not appear on the electronic version of the DVD Brockport made, it is quite audible on the YouTube clip immediately following a sampling of a Lady Gaga song which ended his poetry reading.  Those three words were words he not only lived by but demanded of his creative writing students.

Arroyo died in the early morning of May 7, 2010 due to a cerebral hemorrhage.

Critical reception
Arroyo was included in the Heath Anthology of American Literature published in 2006; this book is commonly taught in English college classes in the U.S. He won the 2004–05 John Ciardi Poetry Prize for The Portable Famine; the 1997 Carl Sandburg Poetry Prize for his book The Singing Shark; and a 1997 Pushcart Prize for the poem "Breathing Lessons" as published in Ploughshares.  Other awards include: Stonewall Books Chapbook Prize; The Sonora Review Chapbook Prize, the Hart Crane Memorial Poetry Prize, and a 2007 Ohio Arts Council Excellence Award in Poetry.

Betsy A. Sandlin published an article on him ("Poetry Always Demands All My Ghosts: The Haunted and Haunting Poetry of Rane Arroyo") in a landmark issue of CENTRO: Journal of the Center for Puerto Rican Studies on Puerto Rican queer studies. Lawrence La Fountain-Stokes has also written about his work.

Works

Books of poetry
Columbus's Orphan. Arcadia, Fl.: JVC books, 1993, .
The Singing Shark. Tempe, AZ: Bilingual Press, 1996, .
Pale Ramón. Cambridge, Mass.: Zoland Books, 1998, .
Home Movies of Narcissus. Tucson: University of Arizona Press, 2002, .
The Portable Famine. Kansas City, Mo.: BkMk Press, 2005, .

The Roswell Poems. La Porte, Ind.: WordFarm, 2008, .
Same-Sex Séances. New Sins Press, 2008, .
The Buried Sea: New & Selected Poems.  Tucson: University of Arizona Press, 2008, .
The Sky's Weight. Turning Point Press, 2009, .
White as Silver: Poems. West Somerville, MA: Cervená Barva Press, 2010, .

Book of short stories
How to Name a Hurricane. Tucson: University of Arizona Press, 2005, .

Performed plays
The Amateur Virgin, Buddha and the Señorita, Tiara Tango, Emily Dickinson in Bandages, A Family in Figleaves, Prayers for a Go-Go Boy, Honeymoon Rehearsals, House with Black Windows (with the poet Glenn Sheldon), Red House On Fire, and Horatio: An Inquisition

Published plays
 Dancing at Funerals: Selected Plays. Tokio and Toronto: ahadada books, 2010, .
 Buddha and the Señorita, Sex with the Man-in-the-Moon, Spanish Moon, Bed But No Breakfast, Fade to White (with the poets Glenn Sheldon and Diane Williams), Honeymoon Rehearsals, and A Lesson in Writing Love Letters

Awards and honors
 1985	Jane Chambers Playwriting Award.  Other Couples: Three One-Act Plays
 1991  1st Prize, Hart Crane Memorial Award, Kent State University, for the poem "Le Mal de Siam"
 1992	2nd place, Allen Ginsberg Poetry Award for poem "The Carlos Poems #1"
 1993	Winner of the George Houston Bass Drama Award, Brown University's Rites and Reason Theater, for the play The Amateur Virgin
 1993  Winner of the Sonora Review/University of Arizona's National Chapbook Contest for The Red Bed poems
 1997  Carl Sandburg Poetry Award for The Singing Shark
 1997 	Pushcart Prize for poem, "Breathing Lessons," published in Ploughshares
 1997	Winner of the Stonewall Books National Chapbook Contest for The Naked Thief
 1998  Arts Commission of Greater Toledo Individual Artist Grant for "Blood Never Rusts", an experimental story
 1999	Honorable Mention, Crossing Borders 1999 Contest, Wharf Rat Theater, The Darkness after a Millennium of Blondes
 2001  Finalist, 7th Annual West Coast Ten-Minute Playwriting Contest "Lord Byron, The God"
 2001–02  Arts Commission of Greater Toledo Individual Artist Grant for Creative Non-fiction  Essay on Toledo, "Glass Words"
 2004 	Finalist for The Ohioana Award for Home Movies of Narcissus
 2004  Gwendolyn Brooks Poetry Prize/1st Place for Winter Wear (The Immigrants)
 2004–05   John Ciardi Poetry Prize for the poetry collection, The Portable Famine, included publication
 2005	Included in the prestigious Heath Anthology of American Literature: Volume E, Contemporary Period: 1945 to the Present (5th Edition)Editor: Dr. Paul Lauter, Houghton Mifflin, 2005: 2989–2995, introductory essay by Dr. Lawrence La Fountain-Stokes (U of Michigan—Ann Arbor)
 2006  Caesar Chavez Visiting Writer, Saginaw Valley State University
 2006	ForeWord Poetry Book of The Year Finalist for The Portable Famine
 2006 	Independent Publishers Awards finalist nominee for How to Name a Hurricane
 2006  Nominated for a Pushcart Prize (by Cream City Review) for What Daniel and I Talk About When We're Naked
 2007	Included in Contemporary Authors. Also in The Latino Encyclopedia
 2007 	Nominated for a Pushcart Prize (by Poems & Plays) for A Lesson in Writing Love Letters, a one-act play
 2007–08   Ohio Arts Council Excellence Award in Poetry/State Grant
 2009  Inducted into the Ohio Center of the Book
 2009  Nominated for the 15th time for a Pushcart Prize by Saranac Review for  The Closet
 2009	Nominated for the 16th time for a Pushcart Prize by Aperture for "
 2009	The International Latino Literary Prize:  Honorable Mention in Poetry:  The Buried Sea: New and Selected Poems

Legacy
In 2012, Seven Kitchens Press announced the creation of the Rane Arroyo Chapbook Prize for an original, unpublished poetry manuscript. The editors for this prize are Dan Vera and Ron Mohring. The co-winners of the inaugural prize were Steven Alvarez and Rhett Watts.

In 2015, Arroyo was inducted into the Chicago Literary Hall of Fame.

See also

 List of Puerto Rican writers
 List of Latin American writers
List of Puerto Ricans
Multi-Ethnic Literature of the United States
American poetry
LGBT literature
Puerto Rican literature

References

External links
 Rane Arroyo - Poetry Foundation

1954 births
2010 deaths
Affrilachian Poets
American gay writers
LGBT people from Illinois
American people of Puerto Rican descent
Writers from Chicago
University of Pittsburgh alumni
University of Toledo faculty
Chapbook writers
American LGBT poets
LGBT Hispanic and Latino American people
Gay academics
20th-century African-American people
21st-century African-American people
African-American male writers
Gay poets